Stare Karmonki  (German: Alt Karmunkau) is a village in the administrative district of Gmina Radłów, within Olesno County, Opole Voivodeship, in south-western Poland.

References

Stare Karmonki